Kodali Sri Venkateswara Rao, commonly known as Kodali Nani, is an Indian politician and a Member of Legislative Assembly (MLA) of Andhra Pradesh Legislative Assembly, representing Gudivada Assembly constituency. He is a former Minister for Civil Supplies and Consumer Affairs in the state of Andhra Pradesh. He belongs to the YSR Congress Party.

Political career 

 In 2004 and 2009 Andhra Pradesh Legislative assembly elections, Nani contested as a member of Telugu Desam Party and won as the Member of Legislative Assembly (MLA).
 In 2012, Nani departed from Telugu Desam Party and joined the YSR Congress Party.
 In the 2014 Andhra Pradesh Legislative assembly elections, Nani won as Member of Legislative Assembly (MLA).
 In the 2019 Andhra Pradesh Legislative assembly elections, Nani won again in Gudivada constituency against Devineni Avinash with a majority of 19,479 votes.
 In 2019, Nani took the oath as the Minister for Civil Supplies and Consumer Affairs on 8 June and served in the position until 7 April 2022. 
As per ADR report 2019, He is convicted in IPC Sections – 152, 353, 426 on 30 July 2012 and Sentenced to undergo RI for a period of one year and pay fine of Rs. 1000/- u/s 353 and Rs. 1000/- u/s 426. There are 3 pending cases under 15 different IPC sections against him. He declared total assets of Rs. 14,82,19,363 in affidavit filed by him during 2019 AP Assembly elections.

Filmography

References

Living people
Date of birth missing (living people)
YSR Congress Party politicians
Andhra Pradesh MLAs 2014–2019
Andhra Pradesh politicians
1971 births
Andhra Pradesh MLAs 2019–2024